2013 Thai League Division 1 (known as Yamaha League 1 for sponsorship reasons) is the 16th season of the League since its establishment in 1997. It is the feeder league for the Thai Premier League. A total of 18 teams will compete in the league this season.

Changes from last season

Team changes

From Division 1
Promoted to Thai Premier League
 Ratchaburi
 Suphanburi 
 Bangkok United

Relegated to Regional League Division 2
 Phattalung
 JW Rangsit
 Raj Pracha
 Chanthaburi

To Division 1
Relegated from Thai Premier League
 BBCU
 Singhtarua
 TTM Chiangmai
Promoted from Regional League Division 2
 Ayutthaya
 Rayong
 Rayong United
 Trat

Renamed Clubs

 TTM Chiangmai renamed TTM Lopburi. 
 after tree game TTM Lopburi renamed TTM.

Expansion Clubs
 Nakhon Pathom United

Teams

Stadia and locations

Personnel and sponsoring
Note: Flags indicate national team as has been defined under FIFA eligibility rules. Players may hold more than one non-FIFA nationality.

Foreign players
The number of foreign players is restricted to seven per DIV1 team, including a slot for a player from AFC countries. A team can use four foreign players on the field in each game, including at least one player from the AFC country.

League table

Results

Season statistics

Top scorers
.

Hat-tricks

Annual awards

Player of the Year
Goalkeeper of the Year –  Erikson Noguchipinto
Defender of the Year –  Phaisan Pona
Midfielder of the Year –  Sarach Yooyen
Striker of the Year –  Lee Tuck

Coach of the Year
The Coach of the Year was awarded to  Narasak Boonkleng.

Golden Boot
The Golden Boot was awarded to  Leandro de Oliveira da Luz.

See also
2013 Thai Premier League
2013 Regional League Division 2
2013 Thai FA Cup
2013 Thai League Cup
2013 Kor Royal Cup

References

2013
2